Eliezer Sandberg (born 21 February 1962) is a former Israeli politician who served as a government minister between 2003 and 2004.

Biography
Born in Haifa, Sandberg studied law at Tel Aviv University, gaining an LLB. He joined the Tzomet party, and became a member of its secretariat in 1988. He also served as the party's legal adviser and chairman of its Haifa branch. In 1992 he was elected to the Knesset on Tzomet's list. He was re-elected in 1996 and in November 1998 was appointed Deputy Minister of Education. On 23 February 1999 he left Tzomet to become a founding member of the Israel in the Centre party (later renamed the Centre Party), but on 22 March he left the new party to establish his own faction, HaTzeirim. On 29 March merged HaTzeirim into Shinui.

Sandberg was re-elected on the Shinui list in 1999 and 2003, and in February 2003 was appointed Minister of Science and Technology, a role he held until July 2004 when he became Minister of National Infrastructure. He left the cabinet on 4 December 2004 when Shinui left the coalition government.

In January 2006 Sandberg was amongst the Shinui MKs which left the party to establish the Secular Faction. On 5 February he and Hemi Doron left the new faction to establish the National Home. Prior to the 2006 elections the two joined Likud, but were not included on its list, and thus lost their seats in the election.

In 2017 he was named as a suspect in a corruption-tainted multi-million-dollar deal with German shipyard.

References

External links
 

1962 births
People from Haifa
Tel Aviv University alumni
Israeli lawyers
Living people
National Home politicians
Tzomet politicians
Centre Party (Israel) politicians
Shinui politicians
Hetz (political party) politicians
HaTzeirim politicians
Israeli Jews
Members of the 13th Knesset (1992–1996)
Members of the 14th Knesset (1996–1999)
Members of the 15th Knesset (1999–2003)
Members of the 16th Knesset (2003–2006)
Ministers of Science of Israel
Deputy ministers of Israel